Johnstonmawsonia is a genus of nematodes belonging to the family Rhabdochonidae, and was first described in 1955 by Yvonne Campana-Rouget.

The species of this genus are found in Central America.

Species:

Johnstonmawsonia murenophidis 
Johnstonmawsonia porichthydis

References

Nematodes
Nematodes described in 1955